. 

Mohamed Faleel Marjan Asmi (born 10 June 1962) is a Sri Lankan politician and Member of Parliament.

Marjan Faleel was born on 10 June 1962. He is the son of M S M Faleel Hajiar, former western provincial council member and former Chairman of the Beruwala Urban Council. Marjan Faleel also served as chairman of the urban council. Following the 2020 parliamentary election he was appointed to the Parliament of Sri Lanka as a National List MP representing the Sri Lanka People's Freedom Alliance.

Tell••0783994190

References

1962 births
Local authority councillors of Sri Lanka
Living people
Members of the 16th Parliament of Sri Lanka
Sri Lankan Moor politicians
Sri Lankan Muslims
Sri Lanka People's Freedom Alliance politicians
Sri Lanka Podujana Peramuna politicians